Memoria is the third studio album of Argentine band Erreway. The songs were written by Maria Cristina de Giacomi and Carlos Nilson, who also wrote for the albums "Señales (2002) and Tiempo (2003). The album was released in June 2004, and sold 500,000 copies only in South America. The songs "Asignatura Pendiente", "Vivo Como Vivo", "De Aquí, de Allá", "Solo Sé" and "Memoria" were used in the Erreway movie Erreway: 4 Caminos (2004).

Track listing 
"Memoria"  – 4:34
"Solo Sé"  – 4:22
"De Aquí, de Allá"  – 3:15
"Asignatura Pendiente"  – 4:00
"No Hay Que Llorar"  – 3:38
"Dame"  – 4:07
"Bandera Blanca"  – 3:31
"Mañana Habrá"  – 3:14
"Vivo Como Vivo"  – 3:19
"Perdiendo, Ganando"  – 3:22
"Que Se Siente"  – 4:25

Personnel 
 Benjamin Rojas – vocals
 Camila Bordonaba – vocals
 Felipe Colombo – vocals
 Luisana Lopilato – vocals

References

Erreway albums
2004 albums